The Billboard Regional Mexican Albums chart, published in Billboard magazine, is a record chart that features Latin music sales information. This data are compiled by Nielsen SoundScan from a sample that includes music stores, music departments at electronics and department stores, Internet sales (both physical and digital) and verifiable sales from concert venues in the United States. The data for this chart was published every two weeks, unlike most Billboard charts.

The Regional Mexican Albums chart was first of the three Latin-related albums (along with Latin Pop Albums and Tropical Albums) published on June 29, 1985, eight years before the Top Latin Album survey which began on July 10, 1993.  Billboard published a biweekly chart throughout the 1980s.  

Los Tigres del Norte were the first artists to reach number-one with their album, Jaula de Oro'''. Three other albums by the group: El Otro Mexico, Los Idolos del Pueblo, and Los Corridos Prohibidos reached number-one on the Regional Mexican charts. Each album by the group received a Grammy Award-nomination for Best Mexican-American Performance.

Los Bukis, led by Marco Antonio Solís, were the second artists to reach number-one with their album, A Donde Vas.

Joan Sebastian was the first solo performer of Regional Mexican music to reach number-one with his album Rumores. Another album by Joan Sebastian, Con Tambora was the longest number-one Regional Mexican album which spent 23 consecutive weeks.

Los Bondadosos reach number-one in the chart for the first time with their album, Porque me haces sufrir. In addition, a compilation album related to group reached number-one on the chart.

Two albums by Los Yonic's reached number-one on the chart: Petalo y Espinas and Siempre Te Amaré. The former received a Grammy Award-nomination for Best Mexican-American Performance.

Near the end of the decade, Vicente Fernández's album, Por  Tu Maldito'' spent 11 consecutive weeks number-one on the chart.

Number-one albums

References 

Regional Mexican 1980s
United States Regional Mexican
1980s in Latin music
Regional Mexican music albums